

Incorporated
American Revolutionary War, 1776–1780 (Perpetrator:  Great Britain)
War of 1812, 1812–1815 (Perpetrator:  United Kingdom,  British Canada)
Thornton Affair, April 26, 1846 (Perpetrator:  Second Federal Republic of Mexico)
Mexican–American War, 1846–1848 (Perpetrator:  Second Federal Republic of Mexico)
American Civil War, 1861-1865 (Perpetrator:  Confederate States of America)
Black Tom explosion, July 30, 1916 (Perpetrator:   German Empire)
Battle of Columbus, 1916 (Perpetrator: Pancho Villa's División del Norte)
Attack on Orleans, 1918 (Perpetrator:  German Empire)
Battle of Ambos Nogales, 1918 (Perpetrator: Improvised Mexican civilian volunteers)
Bombing of Naco, 1929 (Perpetrator: Escobar rebels)
Attack on Pearl Harbor, December 7, 1941 (Perpetrator:  Empire of Japan)
American Theater (World War II), 1941–1945 (Perpetrator:  Empire of Japan,  Nazi Germany,  Kingdom of Italy)
Attack on Goleta, Calif, Feb. 23, 1942, (Perpetrator:  Empire of Japan) https://goletahistory.com/attack-on-ellwood/
1993 World Trade Center bombing, February 26, 1993 (Perpetrator:  Al-Qaeda)
September 11 attacks in New York City; Arlington County, Virginia; and Shanksville, Pennsylvania, September 11, 2001 (Perpetrator:  Al-Qaeda)
Naval Air Station Pensacola shooting, December 6, 2019 (Perpetrator:  Al-Qaeda in the Arabian Peninsula)

Unincorporated
Japanese invasion of the Philippines, 1941–1945
Battle of Guam, 1941
Battle of Wake, 1941
Battle of Midway, 1942

See also
Impressment
Texas Revolution
California Republic
Mexican Revolution
United States involvement in the Mexican Revolution
Johann Heinrich von Bernstorff
List of conflicts in the United States
Invasion of the United States
Terrorism in the United States

United States territory
Military history of the United States